Pseudonaclia fasciata is a moth in the subfamily Arctiinae. It was described by Max Gaede in 1926. It is found in Tanzania.

References

Endemic fauna of Tanzania
Moths described in 1926
Arctiinae